Calvary Baptist School can refer to:
Calvary Baptist School (Pennsylvania)
Calvary Baptist School (Wisconsin)
Calvary Baptist Schools in La Verne, California